The 1952 Abilene Christian Wildcats football team represented Abilene Christian College—now known as Abilene Christian University—as a member of the Texas Conference (GCC) during the 1952 college football season. Led by third-year head coach Garvin Beauchamp, the Wildcats compiled an overall record of 6–3–1 with a mark of 4–0 in conference play, winning the Texas Conference title for the fourth consecutive season.

Schedule

References

Abilene Christian
Abilene Christian Wildcats football seasons
Abilene Christian Wildcats football